National Highway 44 (NH 44) is a major north–south National Highway in India and is the longest in the country.

It passes through the Union Territory of Jammu and Kashmir, in addition to the states of Punjab, Haryana, Delhi, Uttar Pradesh, Rajasthan, Madhya Pradesh, Maharashtra, Telangana, Andhra Pradesh, Karnataka, and Tamil Nadu.

It came into being by merging seven national highways, in full or part, starting with the Jammu-Srinagar National Highway (former NH 1A) from Srinagar in Jammu and Kashmir, former NH 1 in Punjab and Haryana ending at Delhi, part of former NH 2 starting from Delhi and ending at Agra, former NH 3 (popularly known as Agra-Bombay National Highway) from Agra to Gwalior, former NH 75 and former NH 26 to Jhansi, and former NH 7 via Lakhnadon, Seoni, Nagpur, Hinganghat, Adilabad, Nirmal, Hyderabad, Kurnool, Anantapur,Chikkaballapur, Bangalore, Hosur, Krishnagiri, Dharmapuri, Salem, Namakkal, Karur, Dindigul, Madurai,   Virudhunagar and Tirunelveli terminating at Kanyakumari.

Delhi (Mubarka Chowk) to Panipat 70 km section is being upgraded also known as Delhi-Panipat Expressway, at the cost of ₹2,178.82 crores, to a elevated tolled expressway with 8 main lane and 4 (2+2) service lanes, 90% work of which was completed by January 2023. The NH-44 road between Salem and Thoppur in Tamil Nadu is very much prone to fatal accidents due to the poor road design in the hilly slopes.

Route 
The highway starts from Srinagar. The highway connects several cities and towns such as Srinagar, Anantnag, Jammu, Pathankot, Dasua, Jalandhar, Ludhiana, Ambala, Kurukshetra, Karnal, Panipat, Sonipat, Delhi, Faridabad, Palwal, Vrindavan, Mathura, Gwalior, Jhansi, Lalitpur, gurha , Sagar, Narsinghpur, Lakhnadon, Seoni, Nagpur, Hinganghat, Adilabad, Nirmal, Kamareddy, Hyderabad,
Jadcherla, Kurnool, Gooty, Anantapur, Chikkaballapur, Bengaluru, Hosur, Krishnagiri, Dharmapuri, Salem, Namakkal, Karur, Dindigul, Madurai, Virudhunagar, Tirunelveli and Kanyakumari. It is the longest national highway in India.

Route length in states and UT 
 Jammu and Kashmir : 
 Himachal Pradesh: 
 Punjab: 
 Haryana: 
 Uttar Pradesh: 
 Rajasthan: 
 Madhya Pradesh: 
 Maharashtra: 
 Telangana: 
 Andhra Pradesh: 
 Karnataka: 
 Tamil Nadu:

Bengaluru–Hosur Road

Bengaluru–Hosur Road  of this highway connects Bengaluru, the capital of the state of Karnataka, and the city of Hosur, in the Krishnagiri district on the border of Karnataka and Tamil Nadu. It is a four- to six-lane highway which also has service lanes on either sides at the busier parts. Apart from being a part of the National Highway, the road is also significant because it consist of many industrial and IT business houses. The IT industrial park Electronic City is also located alongside Hosur Road.

The National Highways Authority of India has constructed a  elevated highway between Bommanahalli and Electronic City. This toll road has made travel to Electronic City a lot faster. The Bruhat Bengaluru Mahanagara Palike and the Bengaluru Development Authority have planned a series of flyovers and underpasses to make this arterial road signal-free.

Major intersections

   in Anantnag
   in Domel 
   in Jammu
   in Pathankot
   in Jalandhar
   in Ludhiana
   in Rajpura
   in Ambala
   in Karnal
   in Panipat
   in Sonipat 
   in New Delhi
   in Palwal
   in Agra
   in Dholpur
   in Gwalior
   in Jhansi
   in Sagar
   in Narasinghpur
   in Lakhnadon 
   in Seoni
   in Ramtek
   in Nagpur
   in Nirmal
   in Nizamabad
   in Hyderabad
   in Kurnool
   in Dhone
   in Gooty
   in Anantpur 
   in Chikkaballapur
   in Bangalore
   in Hosur
   in Krishnagiri
   in Dharmapuri
   in Salem
   in Karur
   in Dindigul
   in Madurai
   in Thirumangalam 
   in Tirunelveli
   near Nagercoil
   in Kanyakumari

Primary Destinations
- Srinagar - Jammu - Kathua (Jammu and Kashmir) - Pathankot - Jalandhar - Ludhiana (Punjab) - Ambala - Kurukshetra - Panipat - Sonipat (Haryana) - Delhi (Delhi) - Faridabad - Palwal (Haryana) - Mathura - Agra (UP) - Dholpur (Rajasthan)

- Morena (MP)  - Gwalior (MP) - Jhansi - Lalitpur (UP) - Sagar - Narsinghpur - Lakhnadon - Seoni (MP) - Nagpur - Hinganghat (Maharashtra) - Adilabad - Nirmal - Nizamabad- Kamareddy - Hyderabad - Jadcherla (Telangana) - Kurnool -  Dhone - Anantapur (AP) - Chikkaballapur - Bangalore (Karnataka) - Hosur - Krishnagiri - Dharmapuri - Salem - Karur - Dindigul - Madurai - Tirunelveli - Kanyakumari (Tamil Nadu)

Notes
A major stretch of NH 44 from Lakhnadon to Kanyakumari has been selected as a part of the North-South Corridor by the National Highways Development Project.
Approximately  stretch of NH 44 between Bengaluru and Krishnagiri has been selected as a part of the Golden Quadrilateral also by the National Highways Development Project.

See also
 List of National Highways in India (by Highway Number)
 National Highways Development Project
 NH 138

References

External links
NH 44 on OpenStreetMap

AH1
National highways in India
National Highways in Jammu and Kashmir
National Highways in Haryana
National Highways in Uttar Pradesh
National Highways in Madhya Pradesh
National Highways in Maharashtra
National Highways in Telangana
National Highways in Andhra Pradesh
National Highways in Karnataka
National Highways in Tamil Nadu
Golden Quadrilateral
Transport in Srinagar
Transport in Kanyakumari
North–South and East–West Corridor